Paul Bonnefont (born 1900, date of death unknown) was a French wrestler. He competed in the Greco-Roman light heavyweight event at the 1924 Summer Olympics.

References

External links
 

1900 births
Year of death missing
Olympic wrestlers of France
Wrestlers at the 1924 Summer Olympics
French male sport wrestlers
Place of birth missing
Governors of Ubangi-Shari